Governor Beckwith may refer to:

George Beckwith (British Army officer) (1753–1823), Governor of Bermuda from 1798 to 1803, Governor of Saint Vincent from 1806 to 1808, and Governor of Barbados from 1810 to 1815
Thomas Sydney Beckwith (1770–1831), Governor of Bombay from 1830 to 1831